Edward Hugo Cermak (July 23, 1881– November 22, 1911) was an American professional baseball player. He played in one game in Major League Baseball for the Cleveland Blues on September 9, 1901. Starting the game in right field, he had four plate appearances and struck out in all four.

Cermak became an umpire after his playing days and was apparently struck in the throat by a foul ball at some point during the 1911 season, losing his speaking ability. When Cermak died late that year, the newspaper in his hometown reported that his death was related to the on-field injury. However, authors Robert Gorman and David Weeks write that Cermak died of tuberculosis and that the throat injury was not listed as a contributing factor on Cermak's death certificate.

He was buried at Woodland Cemetery in Cleveland.

References

External links

Major League Baseball outfielders
Cleveland Blues (1901) players
Galveston Sand Crabs players
Austin Senators players
South Bend Greens players
Waco Navigators players
Shreveport Pirates (baseball) players
Wichita Jobbers players
Rockford Reds players
Baseball players from Cleveland
Sports deaths in Ohio
1880s births
1911 deaths
20th-century deaths from tuberculosis
Burials at Woodland Cemetery (Cleveland)
Tuberculosis deaths in Ohio
Baseball umpires